Çalışkanlar is a village in the Şemdinli District, Hakkâri Province, Turkey. The village had a population of 1,392 in 2022.

The hamlets of Kepenek, Koçbaşı (Geyman), Küplüce, Samanlı, Üçgöze, Veliköy and Yeşilöz are attached to the village.

History 
The village was populated by 100 Assyrian families in 1877.

References 

Kurdish settlements in Hakkâri Province
Villages in Şemdinli District

Historic Assyrian communities in Turkey